Impulse is a 2010 suspense thriller short film written, produced, and directed by Scott Beck and Bryan Woods. The film is about the last day on Earth as deadly events unfold around a man (Chris Masterson) racing to his final and most significant act. The film made its debut on the closing night of the 2010 LA Shorts Fest. Impulse was picked up for distribution by Shorts International.

Production
The film was produced by Bluebox Limited Films and shot in Perry, Iowa in November 2009. Post-production was completed at Skywalker Sound and Company 3.

References

External links

2010 films
Films directed by Scott Beck and Bryan Woods
Films shot in Iowa
2010 short films
2010 thriller films
American thriller films
2010s English-language films
2010s American films